Zgornje Konjišče is a settlement north of Podgorje on the right bank of the Mura River in the Municipality of Apače in northeastern Slovenia.

History
Zgornje Konjišče became a separate settlement in 1952, when the former village of Konjišče was divided into this village and neighboring Spodnje Konjišče.

References

External links 
Zgornje Konjišče on Geopedia

Populated places in the Municipality of Apače